Muhammad Nabil Jan Al bin Jeffri (born 24 October 1993, in Kuala Lumpur) is a Malaysian racing driver.

Career

Jeffri began his career in karting winning the Asian and Malaysian Rotax Max Junior titles in 2009. He stepped up to Formula BMW Pacific in 2010, racing for Eurasia Motorsport. On 1 September 2010, Jeffri carried out an aerodynamic test for the Lotus Racing Formula One team, driving the Lotus T127 on the airfield at the Imperial War Museum Duxford, becoming the youngest ever test driver in Formula One history. He drove for the team as a member of the AirAsia ASEAN Driver Development Program run by Lotus principal Tony Fernandes. In 2013, Nabil Jeffri was selected to be in the PETRONAS Talent Development Program and competed in the ATS FORMEL 3 CUP under Team Eurointernational.

Racing record

Career summary

Complete FIA Formula 3 European Championship results
(key) (Races in bold indicate pole position) (Races in italics indicate fastest lap)

Complete GP2 Series results
(key) (Races in bold indicate pole position) (Races in italics indicate fastest lap)

Complete FIA Formula 2 Championship results
(key) (Races in bold indicate pole position) (Races in italics indicate points for the fastest lap of top ten finishers)

Complete FIA World Endurance Championship results
(key) (Races in bold indicate pole position; races in italics indicate fastest lap)

24 Hours of Le Mans results

References

External links

 
 

1993 births
Living people
Sportspeople from Kuala Lumpur
Malaysian racing drivers
Formula BMW Pacific drivers
German Formula Three Championship drivers
24 Hours of Le Mans drivers
FIA Formula 3 European Championship drivers
GP2 Series drivers
FIA Formula 2 Championship drivers
FIA World Endurance Championship drivers
Arden International drivers
Trident Racing drivers
Asian Le Mans Series drivers
Eurasia Motorsport drivers
Motopark Academy drivers
EuroInternational drivers
Jota Sport drivers